János Vas (born 29 January 1984) is a professional Hungarian ice hockey forward currently playing for DVTK Jegesmedvék of the Erste Liga. 

Vas was drafted 32nd overall by the Dallas Stars of the National Hockey League in 2002 NHL Entry Draft. Vas has also played for the Iowa Stars of the American Hockey League, the Idaho Steelheads of the ECHL, and the Malmö Redhawks of the Elitserien. Additionally, Vas has represented the Hungarian national team in several international competitions.

Career statistics

Regular season and playoffs

International

 All statistics taken from NHL.com

References

External links

 

1984 births
Living people
Sportspeople from Dunaújváros
Fehérvár AV19 players
Brynäs IF players
Dallas Stars draft picks
Dragons de Rouen players
Ducs de Dijon players
Dunaújvárosi Acélbikák players
DVTK Jegesmedvék players
Hungarian ice hockey left wingers
Hungarian Jews
IF Troja/Ljungby players
Idaho Steelheads (ECHL) players
Iowa Stars players
Jewish ice hockey players
Malmö Redhawks players
HC Slavia Praha players
Tingsryds AIF players
HC 21 Prešov players
Hungarian expatriate sportspeople in Sweden
Hungarian expatriate sportspeople in the United States
Hungarian expatriate sportspeople in Slovakia
Hungarian expatriate sportspeople in the Czech Republic
Hungarian expatriate sportspeople in France
Expatriate ice hockey players in Sweden
Expatriate ice hockey players in the United States
Expatriate ice hockey players in Slovakia
Expatriate ice hockey players in the Czech Republic
Expatriate ice hockey players in France
Hungarian expatriate ice hockey people